Ian Robertson Cushenan (November 29, 1933 – February 5, 2020) was a Canadian ice hockey defenceman who played 129 games in the National Hockey League between 1957 and 1962. The rest of his career, which lasted from 1954 to 1966, was mainly spent in the American Hockey League.

Playing career
Cushenan began his NHL career with the Chicago Black Hawks organization in 1956. He would later play with the Montreal Canadiens, New York Rangers, and Detroit Red Wings organizations. He won the Stanley Cup in 1959 with the Montreal Canadiens. Cushenan last played on the NHL level during the 1963–64 NHL season. He retired from hockey altogether in 1966 after two seasons with the AHL's Buffalo Bisons. He played in the minor leagues for the St. Catharines Teepees, Cleveland Barons, Quebec Aces, Springfield Indians, Pittsburgh Hornets, and Buffalo Bisons.

Post-playing career
Cushenan was a youth and high school hockey coach throughout the 1970s and 1980s in North Olmsted, Ohio. He lived in the Cleveland, Ohio area until dying on February 5, 2020, at the age of 86.

Career statistics

Regular season and playoffs

References

External links

1933 births
2020 deaths
Buffalo Bisons (AHL) players
Canadian ice hockey defencemen
Chicago Blackhawks players
Detroit Red Wings players
Ice hockey people from Ontario
Montreal Canadiens players
New York Rangers players
Pittsburgh Hornets players
Quebec Aces (QSHL) players
St. Catharines Teepees players
Sportspeople from Hamilton, Ontario
Springfield Indians players
Stanley Cup champions